Oblivion IV may refer to:

 The Elder Scrolls IV: Oblivion, 2006 video game
 Phantasm IV: OblIVion, 1998 horror film